Gisulf II (died between 749 and 753) was the third last duke of Benevento before the fall of the Lombard kingdom. He ruled from 743, when King Liutprand came down and removed Godescalc, to his death up to ten years later.

Life
Gisulf was the son of Romuald II of Benevento and Gumperga, daughter of Aurona, sister of Liutprand. As a relative of the king, he was supported by the royal power, but being a minor on his father's death, one Audelais managed to usurp the duchy. Liutprand removed Audelais and, placing another nephew, Gregory, on the throne, brought Gisulf back to be raised in the royal palace at Pavia.

In 744, Gisulf made a donation of land to the Abbey of Montecassino which would become the basis for the Terra Sancti Benedicti.

The Beneventans (or Samnites) remained faithful to Gisulf and his father's dynasty, however, and when, after Gregory's death, Godescalc usurped the ducal throne, the people rose up and murdered him, allowing Liutprand to place the now-adult Gisulf in power. According to Hartmann , Gisulf followed the policies of Liutprand faithfully.

He was married to Scauniperga.

Sources
Lexikon des Mittelalters: Gisulf II. Herzog von Benevent (741-749).
Paul the Deacon. Historia Langobardorum. Available at Northvegr.

Notes

749 deaths
Gisulf 2
8th-century rulers in Europe
8th-century Lombard people
Year of birth unknown